George Mortimer Bibb (October 30, 1776 – April 14, 1859) was an American lawyer and politician and the seventeenth United States Secretary of the Treasury. He was chief justice of the Kentucky Court of Appeals and twice represented Kentucky as a senator in Congress, serving from 1811 to 1814 and from 1829 to 1835.

Biography
Bibb was born in Prince Edward County, Virginia, graduated from Hampden–Sydney College in 1791, and later graduated from the College of William & Mary, then studied law. He was admitted to the bar and practiced law in Virginia and Lexington, Kentucky. After making a permanent move to Kentucky, Bibb was elected to the Kentucky House of Representatives in 1806, 1810, and again in 1817. He was appointed a judge of the Kentucky Court of Appeals in 1808 and then chief justice through 1810.

While a wealthy man, he claimed to have faced significant financial difficulties from losses in the Panic of 1837.

Following the death of his father, the Reverend Richard Bibb Sr., George Bibb advised his brother on how to carry out his father's instructions in his will to emancipate his slaves.  George Bibb did so despite his personal pro-slavery views.

Career
In 1811 he was elected to the United States Senate from Kentucky and served until 1814 when he again returned to Lexington to work as a lawyer. He moved to Frankfort, Kentucky in 1816 and sided with the New Court faction in the Old Court-New Court controversy in the 1820s. He was again named Chief Justice of the Kentucky Court of Appeals in 1827, serving for a year.

He was re-elected to the United States Senate in 1829 and served as a Jacksonian Democrat through 1835. During the 21st Congress he was chairman of the U.S. Senate Committee on Post Office and Post Roads. While in the Senate, he was a strong advocate for pro-slavery views.

He was chancellor of the Louisville Chancery Court from 1835 through 1844 and in 1844 became President John Tyler's fourth United States Secretary of the Treasury serving through 1845.

He was in his late sixties when he assumed his Treasury position, dressing "in antique style, with kneebreeches." Bibb's Annual Report on the State of the Finances for 1844 consisted of an elaborate compilation of statistics detailing the financial history of the nation since 1789. In addition, he presented a solid argument for the establishment of a "sinking fund," accumulated through regular deposits and used to pay the interest and principal on the national debt. Bibb advocated using Treasury surplus revenue from customs and internal revenue collection to supply the sinking fund. Such a fund had been used effectively to reduce the deficit from 1789 to 1835, but Bibb was unable to revive it.

After this he was a lawyer in Washington, D.C., and an assistant in the U.S. Attorney General's office.

He was an active Freemason. He was the first master of Russellville Lodge No. 17, Russellville, Kentucky and was master of Hiram Lodge No. 4, in Frankfort. He was also past master of Lexington Lodge No. 1 at Lexington, and served as secretary in 1804. In 1804 he was grand master of Kentucky.

He died in Georgetown, D.C., in 1859, and is buried in Frankfort Cemetery with a cenotaph at the Congressional Cemetery.

External links

References

1776 births
1859 deaths
19th-century American politicians
19th-century American judges
People from Prince Edward County, Virginia
American people of Welsh descent
United States Secretaries of the Treasury
Tyler administration cabinet members
Democratic-Republican Party United States senators from Kentucky
Democratic Party United States senators from Kentucky
Jacksonian United States senators from Kentucky
Kentucky Democratic-Republicans
Kentucky Jacksonians
Judges of the Kentucky Court of Appeals
College of William & Mary alumni
Hampden–Sydney College alumni
Burials at Frankfort Cemetery